Buffie Carruth (born January 7, 1977), also known by her stage name Buffie the Body, is an American model and fitness instructor.

Early life
Carruth was born and raised in Athens, Georgia, United States. She is the third of seven children.

As a teenager, Carruth was a size 3 in jeans and weighed 119 pounds. She visited a nutritionist and started drinking supplement shakes to gain weight In 2001, she started gaining weight up to 180 pounds, and then down to her current weight of 173 pounds.

Modeling career
In 2004, while in Baltimore, Maryland, Carruth met a photographer at a club. She hired him to do a swimsuit photo shoot at her hotel, intending the photos as a gift for her boyfriend. However, without her knowledge or consent, the photographer posted the pictures online. The photographer then sent her links to the different websites where the pictures were featured. In February 2004, the pictures were posted on a Yahoo group, and within a week 20,000 people signed up to view them. Carruth was subsequently contacted by The Core DJ's Worldwide founder, DJ Tony Neal to promote her as a new model/video vixen and he made an introduction to rapper Tony Yayo.

Within a four-month period, Carruth appeared as a video vixen in the music video for Tony Yayo and 50 Cent's So Seductive, and was featured in magazine layouts for King, XXL and Black Men Magazine. In April 2005, she launched and expanded her website: BuffietheBody.com, where she did swimsuit modeling, which attracted considerable interest on the Internet.

After her debut in the "So Seductive" video she received offers for magazine spreads, leads in music videos, requests for guest appearances. She also shot a biographical DVD. She appeared in the music video for Juelz Santana's "Oh Yes". In a year she had appeared in 60 magazines and news articles.

Carruth has appeared several times in Black Men, Black Men SSX, Smooth, Vibe, XXL, King, The Source. In 2012, she reported that Black Men SSX was the only magazine that paid her.

Film and television career
In 2006, Carruth played the role of Big Booty Judy in the film ATL. In 2008, she appeared in the independent dramatic-thriller film, Subtle Seduction.

In August 2006, Buffie the Body Presents Larger Than Life DVD was released, which featured memorable moments from her career. In January 2007, Buffie the Body – In your Dreams: The Making of the 2007 Calendar DVD was released.

Carruth has worked on a hip-hop talk show based in Atlanta. In 2007, she appeared on The Tyra Banks Show discussing her body's transformation. In June 2008, she shot a pilot for a reality show with Vida Guerra.

Writing career
Carruth has worked as a columnist for Black Mens Magazine called "Sex, Love and Relationships".

In 2008, she published an e-book titled Get Your Mind Right: A Step-By-Step Look at the Modeling Career of Buffie the Body". On June 1, 2009, she released her autobiography Vixen Icon.

Health and fitness career
In 2007, Carruth launched a health and fitness website. In 2012, she became a Certified Personal Trainer (CPT) through The National Academy of Sports Medicine. In August 2013, Carruth released fitness DVD Grade A Glutes which was produced by Amalh Mendelsohn through 718 Productions..

Other activities
Carruth has been reported to charge between $2,500 to $3,500 for a public appearance. Carruth reportedly earns up to $10,000 a night hosting parties around the United States. She has hosted over 300–400 parties. She has also been booked outside of the United States in Amsterdam, Trinidad, and elsewhere.

Awards, nominations and recognition
In 2005, Buffie was named XXL's Eye Candy of the Year. She was nominated for the Vibe Video Goddess of the Year award for her appearance in Tony Yayo's "So Seductive" video. She was listed on Black Men magazine's' 101 Sexiest Women.

Personal life
In November 2005, Carruth's younger sister died of cancer. In 2012, her mother also died of cancer.

From 2005 to 2006, Carruth dated DJ Kay Slay. In 2015, she married John Lewis. She lives in South Carolina with her husband.

Carruth does not drink or smoke. She has a 45-inch sized hips with the word "Tasty" tattooed on her right buttock.

In 2006, Carruth got breast implants. In September 2012, she uploaded a video on YouTube revealing that her buttocks are real and not the product of injections, how much urban modeling paid, how female haters fueled her career, how online models are ruining the urban modeling industry, and why she left the urban modeling industry for the fitness industry.

Books
Carruth, Buffie. (2009). "Vixen Icon". Triple Crown Publications. .
Carruth, Buffie. (2008). "Get Your Mind Right: A Step-By-Step Look at the Modeling Career of Buffie the Body".
Carruth, Buffie. (2013). "Why Flat Butts Stay Flat!: A detailed guide on building the glutes".

See also

Hip hop models

References

External links

Bodynomics website
Brick Built website

Ansbacher, Chuck. Buffie The Body. Only. November 3, 2005
“Seven Questions with… Buffie the Body”. Real Recognize Real. August 29, 2006
Clark, Kevin. Buffie the Body: All The Ass-ets. HipHop DX. August 30, 2006
Ewing, Aliya. Buffie The Body: Model Role. HipHop DX. May 15, 2008
EYEgasim: Buffie The Body. Pearl's Window''. June 6, 2008

1977 births
Living people
African-American actresses
American Internet celebrities
American female erotic dancers
American erotic dancers
African-American female models
American female models
African-American models
American exercise instructors
African-American non-fiction writers
African-American businesspeople
American health care businesspeople
Hip hop models
21st-century American actresses
21st-century American non-fiction writers
21st-century American women writers
21st-century American businesspeople
People from Athens, Georgia
Writers from Georgia (U.S. state)
Businesspeople from Georgia (U.S. state)
American women non-fiction writers
21st-century American businesswomen
21st-century African-American women writers
21st-century African-American writers
20th-century African-American people
20th-century African-American women